The third season of The Real Housewives of Dallas, an American reality television series, is broadcast on Bravo. It aired from August 15, 2018, until December 12, 2018, and is primarily filmed in Dallas, Texas. Its executive producers are Adam Karpel, Andrew Hoegl, John Paparazzo, Rich Bye, Samantha Billett and Andy Cohen.

The Real Housewives of Dallas focuses on the lives of Cary Deuber, Stephanie Hollman, LeeAnne Locken, Brandi Redmond, D'Andra Simmons and Kameron Westcott.

Cast and synopsis 
Following the conclusion of the second season, LeeAnne Locken began posting on social media that she would not be participating in the third season, following what she claimed to be "FALSE" portrayals of herself. Locken later clarified on the Reality Rundown podcast, stating she would return only if changes were made. She detailed: "The reality is I think that if we can put certain things in place then it certainly makes it to where you know everyone would feel comfortable moving forward. It's like when you go to start a new job, you have levels that you need to have met. If they can’t meet those levels, you're not going to sign on to go work there. It's the same thing for me. I have a few things that I'm done with. I’m done with this I'm dangerous storyline which is truly ridiculous. The only reason that those girls go so overboard with it is that they really truly believe that they can use that story-line to remove me from the show." Additionally, The Christian Post speculated that Brandi Redmond could also depart the series

On April 11, 2018, it was announced that the series would return for a third season. Two months later, on June 28, the third season was announced, with the entire lineup from the second season returning in full capacity, including Locken and Redmond.

Episodes

References 

The Real Housewives of Dallas
2018 American television seasons